1932 Academy Awards may refer to:

 5th Academy Awards, the Academy Awards ceremony that took place November 18, 1932 honoring films released between August 1, 1931, and July 31, 1932
 6th Academy Awards, the Academy Awards ceremony that took place March 16, 1934 honoring films released between August 1, 1932, and December 31, 1933